RIF rating list is an official ranking system maintained by the Renju International Federation (RIF), to indicate the rankings of Renju players all over the world. The rating system was established in General Assembly 1995 of RIF. Games between Renju players in formal tournaments are counted in the calculation of the ranking list, including World Championships, European Championships, National Championships and some other important tournaments. The RIF rating list is usually updated daily.  The ratings are maintained by the Qualification Commission of RIF. According to the 
qualification system of the World Renju Championship, all the players with at least 10 games with established players, and within the top-20 of the RIF rating list, have the tickets to take part in the qualification tournament of the World Renju Championship. The RIF rating list had been based on the Elo rating system before 2021, and was migrated to the whole-history rating system in August 2021.

Top players

The top 20 players of the RIF rating list (updated on August 5, 2022) are listed as follows:

Historical top players by year

The list of historical top 5 players by year (retrieved on December 31 every year) is listed as follows:

See also
 Renju
 Renju International Federation
 World Championships in Renju

External links
 Official RIF rating list

References

Renju
Sports world rankings